Been There, Done That: Family Wisdom for Modern Times is a 2016 non-fiction book written by real life husband and wife Al Roker and Deborah Roberts.

Overview
An insight into the marriage of media personalities Al Roker and Deborah Roberts.

References

2016 non-fiction books
English-language books
Books about marriage
African-American literature
New American Library books